Patrick or Pat Fleming may refer to:
 Patrick Fleming (Franciscan), Irish Franciscan scholar
 Patrick Fleming (highwayman) (died 1650), Irish highwayman
 Patrick D. Fleming (1918–1956),World War II U.S. Navy fighter ace
 Pat Fleming (pool player) (born 1948), American pocket billiards (pool) player, founder of Accu-Stats Video, and BCA Hall of Fame inductee
 Pat Fleming (politician) (born 1949), state senator in Arizona, and a former US Army analyst
 Pat Fleming (Canadian football) (born 1978), former Canadian Football League punter and placekicker